is a Japanese football player who plays for FC Ryukyu.

Career statistics
Updated to 21 December 2019.

References

External links
Profile at Shonan Bellmare
Profile at Nagoya Grampus

1988 births
Living people
Japan University of Economics alumni
Association football people from Fukuoka Prefecture
Japanese footballers
J1 League players
J2 League players
Sagan Tosu players
Nagoya Grampus players
Shonan Bellmare players
Kyoto Sanga FC players
FC Ryukyu players
Association football forwards